In law, a commercial code is a codification of private law relating to merchants, trade, business entities (especially companies), commercial contracts and other matters such as negotiable instruments.

Many civil law legal systems have codifications of commercial law.

See also
 Civil code
 Civil law (legal system)
 Commercial law

References

Civil law (legal system)